Beyond (a) reasonable doubt is a legal standard of proof required to validate a criminal conviction in most adversarial legal systems. It is a higher standard of proof than the standard of balance of probabilities (US English: preponderance of the evidence) commonly used in civil cases because the stakes are much higher in a criminal case: a person found guilty can be deprived of liberty, or in extreme cases, life, as well as suffering the collateral consequences and social stigma attached to a conviction. The prosecution is tasked with providing evidence that establishes guilt beyond a reasonable doubt in order to get a conviction; failure to do so entitles the accused to an acquittal. This standard of proof is widely accepted in many criminal justice systems, and its origin can be traced to Blackstone's ratio, "It is better that ten guilty persons escape than that one innocent suffer."

In practice

Because a defendant is presumed to be innocent, the prosecution has the burden of proving the defendant's guilt on every element of each criminal charge beyond a reasonable doubt. To do so, the prosecution must present compelling evidence that leaves little real doubt in the mind of the trier of fact (the judge or jury) that the defendant is almost certainly guilty. For any reasonable doubt to exist, it must come from insufficient evidence, or conflicts within the evidence, that would leave an impartial factfinder less than fully convinced of the defendant's guilt. Accordingly, the standard of proof forces the factfinder to ignore unreasonable doubts—doubts that are frivolous, hypothetical, or not logically linked to the evidence—and to consider evidence favoring the accused, since reasonable doubt entitles them to an acquittal.

The term "reasonable doubt" can be criticised for having a circular definition. Therefore, jurisdictions using this standard often rely on additional or supplemental measures, such as a judge's specific instructions to a jury, to simplify or qualify reasonable doubt. Legal systems have tended to avoid quantifying the reasonable doubt standard (for example, "over 90% probability"); legal scholars from a variety of analytical perspectives have argued in favor of quantification of the criminal standard of proof.

By jurisdiction

Medieval Roman law, followed by the English jurist Edward Coke, expressed a similar idea by requiring "proofs clearer than light" for criminal conviction. The formulation "beyond reasonable doubt" is characteristic of Anglophone legal systems since the eighteenth century.

United Kingdom

England and Wales
In English common law prior to the reasonable doubt standard, passing judgment in criminal trials had severe religious repercussions for jurors. According to judicial law prior to the 1780s, "the Juryman who finds any other person guilty, is liable to the Vengeance of God upon his Family and Trade, Body and Soul, in this world and that to come." It was also believed that "[i]n every case of doubt, where one's salvation is in peril, one must always take the safer way. ... A judge who is in doubt must refuse to judge."  It was in reaction to these religious fears that "reasonable doubt" was introduced in the late 18th century to English common law, thereby allowing jurors to more easily convict. Therefore, the original use of the "reasonable doubt" standard was opposite to its modern use of limiting a juror's ability to convict.

Juries in criminal courts in England and Wales are no longer customarily directed to consider whether there is reasonable doubt regarding a defendant's guilt. A 2008 conviction was appealed after the judge had said to the jury, "You must be satisfied of guilt beyond all reasonable doubt." The conviction was upheld; but the Appeal Court made clear their unhappiness with the judge's remark, indicating that the judge should instead have said to the jury simply that before they can return a verdict of guilty, they "must be sure that the defendant is guilty".

The principle of "beyond reasonable doubt" was expounded in Woolmington v DPP [1935] UKHL 1:

Juries are always told that, if conviction there is to be, the prosecution must prove the case beyond reasonable doubt. This statement cannot mean that in order to be acquitted the prisoner must "satisfy" the jury. This is the law as laid down in the Court of Criminal Appeal in Rex v. Davies 29 Times LR 350; 8 Cr App R 211, the headnote of which correctly states that where intent is an ingredient of a crime there is no onus on the defendant to prove that the act alleged was accidental. Throughout the web of the English Criminal Law one golden thread is always to be seen, that it is the duty of the prosecution to prove the prisoner's guilt subject to what I have already said as to the defence of insanity and subject also to any statutory exception. If, at the end of and on the whole of the case, there is a reasonable doubt, created by the evidence given by either the prosecution or the prisoner, as to whether the prisoner killed the deceased with a malicious intention, the prosecution has not made out the case and the prisoner is entitled to an acquittal. No matter what the charge or where the trial, the principle that the prosecution must prove the guilt of the prisoner is part of the common law of England and no attempt to whittle it down can be entertained.

Canada
In Canada, the expression "beyond a reasonable doubt" requires clarification for the benefit of the jury. The leading decision is R. v. Lifchus, where the Supreme Court discussed the proper elements of a charge to the jury on the concept of "reasonable doubt" and noted that "[t]he correct explanation of the requisite burden of proof is essential to ensure a fair criminal trial." While the Court did not prescribe any specific wording that a trial judge must use to explain the concept, it recommended certain elements that should be included in a jury charge, as well as pointing out comments that should be avoided.

The Supreme Court suggested that the concept of proof beyond a reasonable doubt should be explained to juries as follows:
 The standard of proof beyond a reasonable doubt is inextricably intertwined with that principle fundamental to all criminal trials, the presumption of innocence.
 The burden of proof rests on the prosecution throughout the trial and never shifts to the accused.
 A reasonable doubt is not a doubt based upon sympathy or prejudice and, instead, is based on reason and common sense.
 Reasonable doubt is logically connected to the evidence or absence of evidence.
 Proof beyond a reasonable doubt does not involve proof to an absolute certainty. It is not proof beyond any doubt, nor is it an imaginary or frivolous doubt. 
 More is required than proof that the accused is probably guilty. A jury that concludes only that the accused is probably guilty must acquit.

The Court also warned trial judges that they should avoid explaining the concept in the following ways: 
 By describing the term reasonable doubt as an ordinary expression that has no special meaning in the criminal law context.
 By inviting jurors to apply to the task before them the same standard of proof that they apply to important, or even the most important, decisions in their own lives.
 By equating proof "beyond a reasonable doubt" to proof "to a moral certainty".
 By qualifying the word "doubt" with adjectives other than reasonable, such as serious,  substantial, or haunting, which may mislead the jury.
 By instructing jurors that they may convict if they are "sure" that the accused is guilty, before providing them with a proper definition as to the meaning of the words beyond a reasonable doubt.

The Supreme Court of Canada has since emphasized in R. v. Starr that an effective way to explain the concept is to tell the jury that proof beyond a reasonable doubt "falls much closer to absolute certainty than to proof on a balance of probabilities." It is not enough to believe that the accused is probably guilty, or likely guilty. Proof of probable guilt, or likely guilt, is not proof beyond a reasonable doubt.

New Zealand
In New Zealand, jurors are typically told throughout a trial that the offence must be proved "beyond reasonable doubt", and judges usually include this in the summing-up. There is no absolute prescription as to how judges should explain reasonable doubt to juries. Judges usually tell jurors that they will be satisfied beyond reasonable doubt if they "feel sure" or "are sure" that the defendant is guilty. In line with appellate court direction, judges do little to elaborate on this or to explain what it means.

Research published in 1999 found that many jurors were uncertain what "beyond reasonable doubt" meant. "They generally thought in terms of percentages, and debated and disagreed with each other about the percentage certainty required for 'beyond reasonable doubt', variously interpreting it as 100 per cent, 95 per cent, 75 per cent and even 50 per cent. Occasionally this produced profound misunderstandings about the standard of proof."

In R v Wanhalla, President Young of the Court of Appeal set out a model jury direction on the standard of proof required for a criminal conviction.

United States
The cornerstone to American criminal jurisprudence is that the accused is presumed innocent until guilt is proved beyond a reasonable doubt. The US Supreme Court held that "the Due Process clause protects the accused against conviction except upon proof beyond a reasonable doubt of every fact necessary to constitute the crime charged."  The US Supreme Court first discussed the term in Miles v. United States: "The evidence upon which a jury is justified in returning a verdict of guilty must be sufficient to produce a conviction of guilt, to the exclusion of all reasonable doubt." The U.S. Supreme Court extended the reasonable doubt standard to juvenile delinquency proceedings because they are considered quasi-criminal. "[W]e explicitly hold that the Due Process Clause protects the accused against conviction except upon proof beyond a reasonable doubt of every fact necessary to constitute the crime with which he is charged."

Juries must be instructed to apply the reasonable doubt standard when determining the guilt or innocence of a criminal defendant.  However, courts have struggled to define what constitutes a reasonable doubt. There is disagreement as to whether the jury should be given a definition of "reasonable doubt."  Some state courts have prohibited providing juries with a definition altogether. In Victor v. Nebraska (1994), the US Supreme Court expressed disapproval of the unclear reasonable doubt instructions at issue, but stopped short of setting forth an exemplary jury instruction.  Reasonable doubt came into existence in English common law and was intended to protect the jurors from committing a potentially mortal sin, since only God may pass judgment on man.  The idea was to ease a juror's concern about damnation for passing judgment upon a fellow man.  Since there is no formal jury instruction that adequately defines reasonable doubt, and based on the origins of the doctrine and its evolution, reasonable doubt may be resolved by determining whether there exists an alternative explanation to the facts seems plausible. If yes, then there is reasonable doubt and the accused must be acquitted.

Japan
Since 1945, Japan has also operated by a "reasonable doubt" standard, including the doctrine of in dubio pro reo, which was instituted by the Supreme Court during a controversial murder trial in 1975 (the Shiratori case brought before the Supreme Court of Japan, see for example notes on Shigemitsu Dandō). However, this is not considered an essential standard in Japan and lower level judges sometimes disregard it.

See also

References

Sociology of law
Skepticism
American legal terminology
Criminal law
Criminal procedure
Legal doctrines and principles
Law of Canada
Legal reasoning
Doubt